Silphidae is a family of beetles that are known commonly as large carrion beetles, carrion beetles or burying beetles. There are two subfamilies: Silphinae and Nicrophorinae. Nicrophorines are sometimes known as sexton beetles. The number of species is relatively small at around two hundred. They are more diverse in the temperate region although a few tropical endemics are known. Both subfamilies feed on decaying organic matter such as dead animals. The subfamilies differ in which uses parental care and which types of carcasses they prefer. Silphidae are considered to be of importance to forensic entomologists because when they are found on a decaying body they are used to help estimate a post-mortem interval.

Taxonomy, evolution, and etymology
The family Silphidae belongs to the order Coleoptera. They are commonly referred to as carrion beetles or burying beetles and are usually associated with carrion, fungi, and dung. In the past, members of the family Agyrtidae were included. This family has two subfamilies, Silphinae and Nicrophorinae. The antenna is made up of 11 segments and is capitate (ending in an abruptly capped club) in the Nicrophorinae and has a more gradual club shape in the Silphinae. The subfamilies also differ in behavior. Members of the subfamily Silphinae show little to no care for their young and breed on large carrion. Nicrophorinae breed on small animal carrion and will bury themselves and their food to rear their offspring in a bi-parental manner. There are approximately 183 species in this family, which are found worldwide although they are commoner in temperate regions. Nicrophorus americanus, known as the American burying beetle, is an endangered species.

The oldest fossils of silphids are known from the Middle Jurassic (~ 163 million years ago) Daohugou Bed in Northern China. Many Silphidae are flightless although they have wings. This loss is thought to be a result due to the changes in habitat over time. Researchers have found that most flight-capable species in this group feed on vertebrate carcasses, whereas flightless species will feed on soil invertebrates. They also found that egg production increased with flight loss because of a more limited food supply.

The word "silphid" or "sylph", first seen in the sixteenth century in Paracelsus' works, refers to any race of spirits inhabiting the air and is described as mortal, but lacking soul. The word is also related to the Latin word silva meaning "forests" or "of the woods".

Diversity and distribution
Silphidae beetles are ubiquitous and are most abundant in the temperate zone. The diversity is also greater in the temperate zone and they are quite rare in the tropics although there are species endemic to the region. It is thought that ants, flies and other carrion feeders outcompete them in these regions. They vary in size from 7 to 45 mm.

There are about 46 different species of Silphidae in North America which include Heterosilpha ramosa, Necrodes surinamensis, Necrophila americana, Nicrophorus americanus, Nicrophorus carolinus, Nicrophorus investigator, Nicrophorus marginatus, Nicrophorus orbicollis, Nicrophorus tomentosus, Oiceoptoma inaequale, Oiceoptoma noveboracense, Oiceoptoma rugulosum, Thanatophilus lapponicus. A species found in Great Britain is Oiceoptoma thoracicum.

Development

Silphidae undergo holometabolous development. The development in the subfamily Silphinae proceeds at a slower rate than in Nicrophorinae. The Silphinae life cycle takes approximately twenty six to fifty eight days to go from an egg to adult. The breakdown of this process is essential to forensic entomologists. The cycle takes two to seven days after the egg is laid to hatch. The larvae will develop through three instars on the carrion lasting for ten to thirty days. After that time period is up the third instar larvae will venture away from the detritus to pupate. Pupation takes fourteen to twenty one days and is the major part of metamorphosis where a grandiose change occurs. During this stage the wings become fully developed and sexual maturity is reached, sometimes called the imago or adult stage where the cycle is then repeated. The Nicrophorinae cycle is generally quicker. Oviposition is done near the carcass and takes twelve to forty eight hours for the eggs to hatch into larvae. The amount of food and parental care exhibited help determine the length of the larval stage. Pupation in this subfamily lasts six to eight days and is completed in the soil. The adult Nicrophorinae will emerge from the soil and venture to find food and a mate.

Reproduction

Nicrophorinae are well known for the habit of locating a carcass and burying it by unearthing the soil underneath it. The burying behavior has seemingly evolved to prevent competition from other insects such as fly maggots. It has been observed that the cooperation of the two parent beetles leads to breeding success. More likely than not a breeding pair will work together, but in cases where there is large carrion males try to boost their reproduction by emitting pheromones. In this way, he will father more offspring, but the reproductive success of the primary female steadily declines. Sometimes, where there is a large carcass the likelihood of intense competition from flies leads to communal breeding. There appears to be a truce between females who would normally compete for the males, and in these cases cooperative behavior extends to females caring for each other's offspring. At the height of breeding season pairs of beetles may compete for the carrion. The losing pair will be ejected from the carrion and if any eggs have been laid they are killed so the new female can lay her own.

Behavior and ecology

Food

Silphid adults feed in a saprophagous manner: they colonize the carrion during all four stages of decomposition, which are fresh, bloated, decay, and dry. The main areas of decomposition for adults are during both the bloated and decaying stages. Silphid larvae mainly inhabit during the decaying and dry stages of the carrion. The primary food source for the subfamily Silphinae is the maggot mass present on the detritus. Nicrophorinae will colonize the body earlier in decomposition in order to avoid competition with maggots. If there is a sufficiently large maggot mass they will not colonize the carcass. The parental care exhibited by this subfamily is that the adult beetles regurgitate food into the mouths of the young larvae until they are mature. Silphinae colonize later in the decaying process and the adults eat the maggot mass, sometimes leaving little maggot evidence left to estimate a post-mortem interval. In the case of the sexton or burying beetles, Nicrophorinae, the adults will bury small animal carcasses and lay their eggs on it. In some species, a slight depression is made on the detritus for maturing larvae that the adult beetles feed and protect. In both subfamilies the larvae are observed to eat the decaying organic material while the adults mainly consume the maggots. Flies are the major competitor of silphids for detritus. If a carcass is infested with maggots, many of the Nicrophorinae will abandon the carcass while members of Silphinae will feed on the maggots.

Defense

Beetles have many different weapons available to protect them against predator attacks. The members of Silphidae have many different modifications that allow them to thrive in different ecological niches including colour warnings (from aposematism to Batesian mimicry), chemical defenses and parental care. Silphines are usually dark in color consisting of gold, black and brown. This dark coloring allows them to blend into their environment. Many nicrophorines have bright orange coloring on their elytra, which may serve as a warning to other predators. Some species secrete a chemical from a rectal gland that consists of aliphatic acids and terpene alcohols. The secretion has a strong, foul odor and may be topically irritating to cockroaches and flies. The species Necrodes surinamensis ejects this secretion as a spray and can rotate the end of its abdomen to spray in all directions.

Locomotion and navigation

Walking is the primary form of locomotion for Silphidae beetles. They are able to travel great distances to find carcasses to breed and feed on. Beetles also have two sets of wings, the elytra and the hind wings. The hind wings are membranous and are modified for flying or swimming. There are some Silphidae who are able to fly, but others have lost this ability throughout evolution. When an animal dies, hydrogen sulfide and some cyclic compounds are released. Silphidae use their sense of smell to locate carcasses from a long distance by chemoreceptors on their antennae, which are adapted to detect these chemicals. At a short distance, the end organs of the palpi  detect the odors. Silphid beetles are usually more active at night, nocturnal, which may help reduce competition.

Competition

Competition from other organisms for the carrion puts the Silphids at both an advantage and a disadvantage. The advantage is that fly competitors lay eggs that result in maggots and supply food for Silphids. The disadvantage for the Nicrophorinae is that if the carcass is already “blown”, referring to Shakespearean time as being infected with fly maggots, they will not colonize. Nicrophorinae have adapted to these situations and will bury the carcass to remove it from other competitors. With this technique, a steady food source is available for the larvae and procreation chances increase.

Silphidae compete for brooding areas. If an invader male overpowers the original male, it will mate with the original female and create a new brood. If an invader female overpowers the original female, it will also create a new brood with the primary male.

Relationships

With humans

Silphids are usually not considered a nuisance to humans. They help the environment by laying their eggs on carcasses and the larvae break down the detritus, which prevents accumulation of deceased organisms.

Carcasses are kept out of sight and foul odors are prevented when Nicrophorinae bury it under the ground. This will also reduce the surface area for flies to lay their eggs and decrease fly population.

Some Silphidae occupy human-inhabited areas and become pests to farmers by using crops as a second source of nutrients. Aclypea opaca in Europe feed on beets. Necrophila americana feed on pumpkin, spinach, and sugar beet.

With other organisms

Members from the family Silphidae are known to have mutualistic relationships with other organisms. Nicrophorinae have a mutual relationship with phoretic mites. Mites from the genus Poecilochirus produce deutonymphs that crawl on Nicrophorinae and are transported to carrion. Once they arrive at the carrion, deutonymphs leave the adult Nicrophorinae and proceed to feed on nearby fly eggs and immature larvae. Mites help Nicrophorinae reduce the number of competitors on carrion. With less competition, both species are able to reproduce successfully underground.

Silphidae are known for being hosts to juvenile nematodes. Nicrophorus vespilloides are closely associated with the nematode parasite. The parasites can be easily transmitted to other hosts during copulation.

Forensic research

Silphidae are one of several families of forensic importance in the order Coleoptera. They are a very important tool in determining a post-mortem interval by collecting Silphid progeny from the carcass, and determining the developmental rate. Based on the number of instars and the larval development stage, a time of death can be estimated. This is very useful in medicocriminal entomology, the emphasis on utilizing arthropods as evidence to aid in solving crimes. Many of the methods in determining stages of development are subjective. However, recent studies have found a more precise way of determining the stage of development of Silphid larvae by measuring the maximum cranial width and other heavily sclerotized areas of the larvae instead of measuring just the length, which is subject to change with each larva, particularly in O. inaequale and N. surinamensis, which are more robust and have greater variations of length. The most accurate instar identification is possible by using distinct morphological features that are instar specific and cannot be affected by the size of the specimen. Although this is possible only for few species with described larvae of all instars, such as Thanatophilus rugosus.

Silphidae are being studied to find more exact estimations of post-mortem intervals and possible manners of death. Also, in the future, entomologists will explore the social behavior of the beetles to a greater degree. Members of family Silphidae are typically the first of the coleopterans to come in contact with carrion. Silphidae larvae are opportunistic predators that will feed on dipteran eggs, larvae, and on the carcass itself. This presents a problem in the determination of post-mortem interval because Silphidae are known to eradicate other species from carrion. By eliminating the first colonizing species Silphidae can give an incorrect post-mortem interval.

Unlike most of the insects used as forensic markers, it is possible to assess if Silphidae adults have colonized a corpse and left it later. For this purpose, some Parasitidae mites (for example, Poecilochirus species) are used due to their phoront-host specificity. If a corpse is invaded by Poecilochirus specimens and no Silphidae were sampled by forensic entomologists, it is reasonable to suspect that some Silphidae carrying Poecilochirus phoretic instars arrived previously to the corpse and abandoned it some time later, leaving Poecilochirus mites in the process.

References

External links

 Horn, GH (1880) Synopsis of the Silphidae of the United States with reference to the genera of other countries.

 
Beetle families
Staphylinoidea
Taxa named by Pierre André Latreille
Scavengers